Mary Helen Roberts (born September 14, 1947) is an American politician who is a member of the Democratic Party. She is a former member of the Washington House of Representatives, representing the 21st district from 2005 to 2015. She did not seek re-election in 2014 and was succeeded by Strom Peterson.

Born in Portland, Oregon, Roberts spent her childhood in Portland, Corvallis, Oregon and Southern California. After graduating from high school, she spend one year at Oregon State University and then transferred to UCLA, from where she graduated.

She is openly gay.

References

Further reading
 Biography on Washington State Legislature website

1947 births
Living people
Democratic Party members of the Washington House of Representatives
Women state legislators in Washington (state)
LGBT state legislators in Washington (state)
People from Lynnwood, Washington